Six Tuscan Poets is an oil on panel by the Florentine visual artist and writer Giorgio Vasari, created in 1544. The poets depicted in the painting from left to right are Cino da Pistoia, Guittone d'Arezzo, Petrarch, Giovanni Boccaccio, Dante Alighieri, and Guido Cavalcanti.

The work was commissioned from Vasari by the Tuscan arts patron Luca Martini.

Today the painting is in the permanent  collection of the Minneapolis Institute of Art. In 2021 it was lent to the Metropolitan Museum of Art, in New York, for the exhibition The Medici: Portraits and Politics, 1512–1570.

References

1544 paintings
Paintings by Giorgio Vasari
Florence
Petrarch
Giovanni Boccaccio
Cultural depictions of Dante Alighieri